London Review has formed the title or partial title of a number of periodicals, some of which lasted only for a short period. These include:

(1775–1780) London Review of English and Foreign Literature, founded by William Kenrick
(1782–1826) European Magazine and London Review
(1809) The London Review, edited by Richard Cumberland
(1829) The London Review, founded by Nassau Senior and Richard Whately
(1835) The London Review, founded by John Stuart Mill and other philosophical radicals, merged into The Westminster Review the following year
(1979, current) London Review of Books